Bushy may refer to:


People
 Ron Bushy (born 1945), co-founder and drummer of the rock band Iron Butterfly
 Bushy Graham (1905–1982), Italian-American boxer
 Bushy or Bushie, informal American term for supporter of George H. W. Bush, George W. Bush, or Jeb Bush

Places
 Bushy Island, Queensland, Australia
 Bushy Islet, Queensland, Australia
 Bushy Mountain, New South Wales, Australia
 Bushy Lake, California, United States

Other uses
 Bushy, spelling of the name of the historical character John Bussy as it appears in Shakespeare's play Richard II

See also
 Bushy Park (disambiguation)
 Bushy Creek
 Bushy House
 Bushy Run
 Bushy-crested (disambiguation)
 Bushi (disambiguation)
 Bushey, a town in Hertfordshire, England